SpongeBob's Truth or Square is a video game based on the SpongeBob SquarePants episode with the same title. It was released on October 26, 2009, for the Xbox 360, Wii, Nintendo DS and the PlayStation Portable.  Altron developed a Nintendo DS version of the game.

On November 15, 2021, the Xbox 360 version of the game was made backwards compatible on the Xbox One and Xbox Series X and Series S.

Plot
SpongeBob has been entrusted by Mr. Krabs to keep the Krabby Patty formula safe. But in all the excitement, SpongeBob forgets where he put the formula. He then relies on the help of the most unlikely companion, Plankton. With the help of his friends, SpongeBob must use Plankton's memory machine to retrace the happiest moments of his life (because according to SpongeBob, he's unable to remember anything when he's sad) to find the Krabby Patty formula in time for the Krusty Krab's "eleventy-seventh" anniversary. Little does SpongeBob know, however, that Plankton wants the formula for himself and has inserted robots into SpongeBob's memories to extract the precise location of the formula. But after breaking the controller, Plankton has no choice but to go inside SpongeBob's memories instead. SpongeBob travels through his memories, fighting robots and robot bosses that look like Patrick and Squidward. He travels various environments as he relives his memories, such as getting his job as fry-cook, meeting Sandy as well as practicing karate with her, his first Christmas, his first 24-hour shift (where he's lost in Rock Bottom), jellyfishing with Patrick, meeting Mermaidman and Barnacleboy, Squidward's first Krabby Patty (where his fights Squid-Bot), and his fake fight with Patrick to get into the Salty Spittoon (where he fights Pat-Bot). He then remembers the formula is in the Krusty Krab safe. Plankton finds this out however and turns the entire Chum Bucket into one giant Plankton-Bot. After destroying it, SpongeBob tells Mr. Krabs the formula is in the safe, but then finds out it was in his back pocket the whole time. However, when he gives the paper to Mr. Krabs, he realizes that he gave him his lottery ticket and that the secret formula was in Mr. Krabs' back pocket the whole time.

Voices
 Tom Kenny as SpongeBob and Gary
 Mr. Lawrence as Plankton
 Bob Joles as Mr. Krabs
 Bill Fagerbakke as Patrick
 Rodger Bumpass as Squidward
 Carolyn Lawrence as Sandy
 Ernest Borgnine as Mermaid Man
 Tim Conway as Barnacle Boy

Features 
Players can turn SpongeBob into a Sledgehammer Smash to whack intruders, a WaterBob sponge to spew water, a giant spatula, a spinning blade (or a spinning pirate ship steering wheel), a MuscleBob BuffPants, or even an Explosive Cannon to aim and blast baddies. Players can reminisce through fan-favorite SpongeBob moments as the game draws upon "The 10 Happiest Moments of SpongeBob's Life" and story elements from the animated television series. In multiplayer mode, players can play as SpongeBob or with a friend playing as Plankton throughout the entire game on both the Wii and Xbox 360 platforms. Each system's cover art has a SpongeBob face. However, the facial expression shown is different between covers. Two levels are exclusive to the PSP and DS versions, Bikini Bottom and The Krusty Krab.

Development

The game development started under the title SpongeBob SquarePants: Happiness Squared, but was later changed early on in development to tie-in with the TV special.

Reception 
SpongeBob's Truth or Square received generally mixed reviews. Corey Cohen of Official Xbox Magazine rated the game 4 out of 10 and considered it boring, while criticizing its "tedious" levels and "irritating" camera. Common Sense Media gave it a score of 4 out of 5 stars.

References

External links 
 SpongeBob's Truth or Square on MobyGames

2009 video games
THQ games
Altron games
Action-adventure games
SpongeBob SquarePants video games
Wii games
Wii MotionPlus games
Xbox 360 games
PlayStation Portable games
Nintendo DS games
Video games developed in Japan
Video games using Havok
3D platform games
Video games developed in the United States
Barking Lizards games
Multiplayer and single-player video games